"Get Up Offa That Thing" is a song written and performed by James Brown. It was released in 1976 as a two-part single (the B-side, titled "Release the Pressure", is a continuation of the same song). It reached #4 on the R&B chart, briefly returning Brown to the Top Ten after a year's absence, and #45 on the Billboard Hot 100. Thanks to its chart success, the song became Brown's biggest hit of the late 1970s. The song's lyrics urge listeners to "Get up offa that thing / and dance 'til you feel better." Due to his troubles with the IRS for failure to pay back taxes, Brown credited authorship of the song to his wife Deidre and their daughters, Deanna and Yamma Brown.

Background
According to Brown, the inspiration for "Get Up Offa That Thing" came to him during a club performance in Fort Lauderdale:The audience was sitting down, trying to do a sophisticated thing, listening to funk. One of the tightest bands they'd ever heard in their lives, and they were sitting. I had worked hard and dehydrated myself and was feeling depressed. I looked out at all those people sitting there, and because I was depressed they looked depressed. I yelled, "Get up offa that thing and dance til you feel better!" I probably meant until I felt better.

Unlike most popular music of the time, which made sophisticated use of multitrack recording and other techniques, "Get Up Offa That Thing" was recorded live in the studio in only two takes.

Brown re-recorded "Get Up Offa That Thing" for the Doctor Detroit soundtrack album. He also performs the song during his guest appearance in the film. Other performances of the song appear on the albums Hot on the One, Live in New York, Live at Chastain Park, and Live at the Apollo 1995.

Credits and personnel 
 James Brown – lead vocal

with The J.B.'s:
 Russell Crimes – trumpet
 Holly Ferris – trombone
 St. Clair Pinckney – tenor saxophone
 Peyton Johnson – tenor saxophone
 Joe Poff Jr. - alto saxophone
 Jimmy Nolen – guitar
 Robert Lee Coleman – guitar
 Charles Sherrell – clavinet
 Melvin Parker – drums
 Will Lee – bass

Chart performance

Appearances in other media 
 "Get Up Offa That Thing" was performed as a mash-up with "Dancing in the Street" by the nuns of Sister Act 2 as led by Whoopi Goldberg.
 It was played during the "Soccer" episode of The Wonder Years with the beginning of the opening game.
 The song is used twice in Jim Henson Pictures' 1999 film Muppets from Space when Gonzo rides the lawnmower.
 The song is featured in the 2009 British film Fish Tank.
 The song is used in the closing sequence of Paramount's 1996 film Harriet the Spy and Blue Sky Studios' 2005 computer animated film Robots. In the latter film, Robin Williams' character called the song, "a fusion of jazz and funk, it's called junk."
 The horn samples of this song were sampled extensively for late 1980s and early 1990s hip-hop.
 The scream in the opening of the song was sampled in Gloria Estefan's 1985 hit single "Conga".
 The song is performed by Oliver James (as Ian Wallace) in the 2003 film What a Girl Wants.
 A modified version of this song is performed along with Dan Aykroyd in the Player's Ball sequence of the 1983 film Doctor Detroit.
 The song appeared in the Volkswagen commercial for the 2012 Super Bowl "The Dog Strikes Back".
 Miss America 2013 Mallory Hagan performed a tap dance to this song as her talent.
 The song appeared in the documentary "Hunt vs Lauda: F1's Greatest Racing Rivals" on BBC Two.
 It was also heard during a Walmart commercial to support Black Friday.
 The song is featured in Martin Lawrence's 2001 film Black Knight.
 The song is played at Fenway Park, home of the Boston Red Sox during the 4th inning to encourage fans to get up and stretch and dance. Similarly, if the game goes 13 innings, the song plays again.
 The song was used as a parody called "Get Up Offa That Tail" for the toy; Dance Star Mickey.
 The song is featured in the 2019 film Shaft.
 The song was sampled by Chris Classic for Rey Mysterio's entrance theme "619" from the compilation album WWE Anthology.
 Was sampled by Jazzy Jay from his song "(This) Def Jam".
 The song is used in Another World in the final episode of the series. Cass is held hostage by a gorilla and the wedding guests must sing along to the song for the gorilla to release him.

References

External links 
 [ Song Review] at Allmusic

1976 songs
1976 singles
James Brown songs
Polydor Records singles
Songs written by James Brown